Daily Mirror is a daily English-language newspaper published in Colombo, Sri Lanka, by Wijeya Newspapers. Its Sunday counterpart is the Sunday Times. Its sister newspaper on financial issues is the Daily FT.

Daily supplements

Mondays through Saturdays
Mirror Business
Life

Tuesdays
W@W – Women at work

Thursdays
Junior Mirror

See also
Lankadeepa, Sinhala-language sister newspaper
Tamil Mirror, Tamil-language sister newspaper

Notes

External links
  - Daily Mirror

Daily newspapers published in Sri Lanka
English-language newspapers published in Sri Lanka
Publications established in 1999
Wijeya Newspapers
Mass media in Colombo